The East Midlands Regional Assembly was the regional chamber for the East Midlands region of the England. It was based at Melton.

History
It was created by the Regional Development Agencies Act 1998. It was based opposite PERA on Nottingham Road in Melton Mowbray.

Function
It was originally created to divide up the money given in government grants for the East Midlands. However, EMDA in Nottingham, the local government-run regional development agency, is taking over this role, and has done similar work in the past. It is currently involved in promoting energy efficiency throughout businesses and local authorities in the East Midlands.

Structure
It had 111 members, with seventy from the 46 local authorities and thirty-five from local businesses. The Assembly Board has 18 members. There are 20 permanent staff. Government funding comes from the Department for Communities and Local Government.

Abolition

The assembly was abolished on 31 March 2010 as part of the UK Government's Review of Sub-National Economic Development and Regeneration. Its functions were assumed by the East Midlands Development Agency and a newly constituted East Midlands Leaders' Board, the executive arm of East Midlands Councils.

See also
 East Midlands
 East Midlands Development Agency
 East Midlands Leaders' Board,

References

External links
 Local Government East Midlands (also based in Melton)
 Government Office for the East Midlands (based on Talbot Street in Nottingham)
 News Distribution Service for the East Midlands from the Central Office of Information

Video clips
 Promotional video

Regional assemblies in England
Organisations based in Leicestershire
Organizations established in 1998
1998 establishments in England
Local government in the East Midlands
Organizations disestablished in 2010
2010 disestablishments in England